A CSS framework is a library allowing for easier, more standards-compliant web design using the Cascading Style Sheets language. Most of these frameworks contain at least a grid. More functional frameworks also come with more features and additional JavaScript based functions, but are mostly design oriented and focused around interactive UI patterns. This detail differentiates CSS frameworks from other JavaScript frameworks.

Two notable and widely used examples are Bootstrap and Foundation.

CSS frameworks offer different modules and tools:

 reset style sheet
 grid especially for responsive web design
 web typography
 set of icons in sprites or icon fonts
 styling for tooltips, buttons, elements of forms
 parts of graphical user interfaces like accordion, tabs, slideshow or modal windows (Lightbox)
 equalizer to create equal height content 
 often used CSS helper classes (left, hide)

Bigger frameworks use a CSS interpreter like Less or Sass.

List of notable CSS frameworks

See also
 Comparison of layout engines (Cascading Style Sheets)

References

Responsive web design
Web design
Usability
Human–computer interaction
User interfaces
Mobile web
 
Adaptive web design